Ihor Lytovka (born 5 June 1988) is a Ukrainian professional footballer who plays as a goalkeeper for Andijon.

Career

Sevastopol 
In 2007 he moved to Sevastopol and he won the Ukrainian First League of the season one season and he got promoted to the Ukrainian Premier League.

Tavriya Simferopol (Loan) 
He was on loan in Tavriya Simferopol in the Ukrainian Premier League, but not played for main squad.

Olimpik Donetsk 
In 2014, he moved to Olimpik Donetsk, where he riched the semifinal of Ukrainian Cup in the season 2014–15.

Voluntari 
In 2015, he played for Voluntari in Romania in Liga II and with the club he won the competition in the season 2014–15.

Riga 
In 2016 he moved from FC Voluntari to Riga in Latvia where he got into the final of the Latvian Cup in the season 2016–17.

Desna Chernihiv 
In winter transfer 2016–17, he signed for Desna Chernihiv and he got promoted to Ukrainian Premier League in the season 2017–18 were he played 11 matches. In summer 2018, after the arrival at the club of Yevhen Past, he become the second goalkeeper of the club of Chernihiv. On 30 October 2019 he played in Ukrainian Cup against MFC Mykolaiv where Desna Chernihiv won 4–2 away at the Tsentralnyi Miskyi Stadion. With the club of Chernihiv he also qualified for the Europa League third qualifying round where he played 5 matches in Ukrainian Premier League in the season 2019–20. On 15 August 2020 he extended his contract with Desna

He played against Rukh Lviv in Desna's first match of 2020–21 Ukrainian Cup, in which the club won 2–1 and qualified for the Round 16.

Zagora Unešić
On 26 August 2022 he moved to Zagora Unešić in Croatia.

Andijon
In February 2023 he signed two-year contract with Andijon in Uzbekistan Super League.

Personal life
In March 2022, his wife gave birth to a daughter named Mia.

Outside of professional football
In March 2022, during the Siege of Chernihiv, Lytovka, together with other Desna's ex-players like Andriy Totovytskyi, Yevhen Selin, Vladyslav Kalitvintsev, Yehor Kartushov, Pylyp Budkivskyi, Levan Arveladze, Andriy Dombrovskyi, Oleksandr Filippov, Artem Favorov and   Denys Favorov, transferred money for the civilian population of the city of Chernihiv.

Career statistics

Club

Honours
Desna Chernihiv
Ukrainian First League: 2017–18

Riga
Latvian Cup Runners-up:2016–17

Sevastopol
Ukrainian First League: (2) 2009–10, 2012–13

Voluntari
Liga II:2014–15

Gallery

References

External links 
 Profile on Official website of FC Desna Chernihiv

 Stats on Sevstopol club site (Rus)
 
 
 
 

1988 births
Living people
People from Nikopol, Ukraine
Ukrainian footballers
FC Elektrometalurh-NZF Nikopol players
FC Sevastopol players
FC Olimpik Donetsk players
Riga FC players
FC Voluntari players
FC Desna Chernihiv players
NK Zagora Unešić players
FK Andijon players
Ukrainian Premier League players
Ukrainian First League players
Ukrainian Second League players
Uzbekistan Super League players
Ukrainian expatriate footballers
Expatriate footballers in Latvia
Expatriate footballers in Romania
Expatriate footballers in Croatia
Expatriate footballers in Uzbekistan
Ukrainian expatriate sportspeople in Latvia
Ukrainian expatriate sportspeople in Romania
Ukrainian expatriate sportspeople in Croatia
Ukrainian expatriate sportspeople in Uzbekistan
Association football goalkeepers
Sportspeople from Dnipropetrovsk Oblast